Song of Texas  is a 1943 American Western film starring Roy Rogers, originally released by Republic Pictures.

Plot
After a fib by Sam Bennett, a former rodeo star and old friend of Roy's, to his daughter back East that he owns a big ranch, Roy agrees to pretend that's the truth when Sue Bennett decides to travel to Texas and pay her father a visit. Complications develop when Sue makes a deal to sell half the ranch to someone else.

Cast
 Roy Rogers as Roy
 Sheila Ryan as Sue Bennett
 Barton MacLane as Jim Calvert
 Arline Judge as Hildegarde

Home media
On August 25, 2009, Alpha Video released Song of Texas on Region 0 DVD.

References

 
 

1943 films
1943 Western (genre) films
American Western (genre) films
Films shot in Lone Pine, California
Republic Pictures films
American black-and-white films
Films directed by Joseph Kane
1940s English-language films
1940s American films